Frederick Gray may refer to:

 Frederick Gray (politician) (died 1933), Australian politician
 Frederick Thomas Gray (1918–1992), Virginia attorney and, briefly, attorney general during Massive Resistance
 Fred Gray (attorney) (born 1930), American civil rights attorney and activist
 Fred Gray (composer), composer of video game music
 Freddy Gray, British journalist

See also
 Freddie Gray (1989–2015), African-American man who died in police custody in Baltimore
 Frederick Grey (1805–1878), First Sea Lord
 Sir Frederick Gray, fictional Minister of Defence in several James Bond films